Seventh Generation, Inc. is an American company that sells eco-friendly cleaning, paper, and personal care products. Established in 1988, the Burlington, Vermont–based company distributes products to natural food stores, supermarkets, mass merchants, and online retailers. In 2016 Anglo-Dutch consumer goods company Unilever acquired Seventh Generation for an estimated $700 million.

Seventh Generation focuses its marketing and product development on sustainability and the conservation of natural resources. The company uses recycled and post-consumer materials in its packaging, as well as biodegradable, plant-based phosphate- and chlorine-free ingredients in its products.

The company attributes the name "Seventh Generation" to the "Great Law of the Iroquois". Per the company, the document states, "in our every deliberation, we must consider the impact of our decisions on the next seven generations."

History

1988-1990

1988: Alan Newman acquires Renew America, a mail-order catalog that sells energy-, water- and resource-saving products. After giving the catalog a new look, an enhanced mix of products, and a new name – Seventh Generation – Newman embarks on a campaign to raise funding for the venture.

1989:  Entrepreneur and author of How to Make the World a Better Place, Jeffrey Hollender joins Newman and helps secure much-needed capital. 

1989:  A mention in the New York Times increases orders seven-fold within a year.

1991-2000
1992: Newman leaves Seventh Generation to start Magic Hat Brewing Company.

1993:
Seventh Generation goes public on 8 November 1993, raising $7 million.

1994: Seventh Generation enters the mass retail market with three products: dishwasher detergent, non-chlorine bleach, and liquid laundry detergent.

1995: Mail-order catalog business sold to Gaiam, Inc. and Seventh Generation focuses solely on its wholesale products business.

2006-2021

2009: Former PepsiCo division president, Chuck Maniscalco joins company as CEO.

2016: In September, Unilever Plc. purchased Seventh Generation for an estimated $700 million.

2021: In July 2021, Alison Whritenour became Seventh Generation's first female Chief Executive Officer.

Awards

Seventh Generation has received multiple awards.

 2004 Corporate Stewardship Award for Small Business from the United States Chamber of Commerce Center for Corporate Citizenship. Award recipients were selected based on "a demonstration of ethical leadership and corporate stewardship, making a difference in their communities, and contributions to the advancement of important economic and social goals."
 Fastest Growing Company in Vermont - 5x5x5 Award from Vermont Business Magazine and KeyBank for "achievements in keeping true to its mission to create healthy products that preserve the environment, every year since 2004."
 Ceres-ACCA North American Awards for Sustainability Reporting - Best Small or Medium Enterprise Corporate Responsibility Report, April 2006 - the international competition was sponsored by Ceres (organization), a national network of investment funds, environmental organizations and other public interest groups working to advance environmental stewardship on the part of businesses, in partnership with the Association of Chartered Certified Accountants, and CoVeris, an independent corporate verification firm. Ceres called Seventh Generation's report "a pioneering effort in transparency for a privately owned company."
 In 2007, Seventh Generation was named the second fastest growing company in Vermont over the past 10 years.
 Fast Company Social Capitalist Award 2007 – Fast Company magazine and Monitor Group.
 The Microsoft Excellence in Environmental Sustainability Award 2008 - Seventh Generation was recognized as a customer who is "using their business management system in an innovative way to track their initiatives around becoming more environmentally sustainable."
In 2009, the IT department at Seventh Generation was named number eight in Computerworld's "Top Green-IT Organizations."  C
In 2018, Seventh Generation was recognized as one of "the 50 most sustainable companies in the world" at the SEAL Business Sustainability Awards.

People

 Former CEO: John Replogle took over as president and CEO in February 2011, taking over from Chuck Maniscalco, who had served in that position since June 2009 when Jeffrey Hollender stepped aside to become Executive Chairperson. Hollender left the company in November 2010. Joey Bergstein took over as CEO in 2017 as John Replogle stepped into the role of Chairman of the Seventh Generation Social Mission Board.

References

External links
 

Unilever
Chemical companies of the United States
Cleaning products
Chemical companies established in 1988
Manufacturing companies based in Vermont
Benefit corporations